Eileen May McCracken (16 February 1920 – 12 November 1988) was an Irish botanist, geographer and historian of botany.  She also wrote on the history of Irish Gardens.

Life
Born 16 February 1920 in Lisburn, Ireland, the daughter of Colin and Bessie Webb, McCracken was educated at the Friends' School Lisburn and the Queens' University, Belfast, where she gained her BSc, M.Sc and PhD (1962).

On 8 April 1944 she married the historian Leslie (J.L.) McCracken MRIA (1914-2008). Three children: Sean, Donal and Dermot. She moved to South Africa in 1947, and lectured at the University of Witwatersrand, on geography. Returned to Ireland in 1950. Lived in Dublin, Derry and Portballintrae before returning to South Africa to retire in 1982.   From 1959 until 1982 she owned a cottage at the seafront at Kilcoole, County Wicklow.

She wrote on the landscape  of Ireland from Tudor times, on early Irish ironworks, on the early Irish plant nursery trade, on the Botanic Gardens in Belfast and on the Irish National Botanic Gardens at Glasnevin.

She held strong views on various subjects, including the rights of women and greatly admired the women involved in the Irish War of Independence. She was a great lover of animals.

She died in Durban in 1988. A plaque of Wicklow granite set in the ground outside the Alpine House at Glasnevin Botanic Gardens reads: 'Eileen May McCracken 1920-1988 Botanist and Historian of this Botanic Garden'.

Legacy
Bound sets of her papers  have been deposited at the National
Botanic Gardens, and in the National Library of Ireland, Dublin.

Bibliography

Further reading
 

The National Library of Ireland has a bound volume of 45 of McCracken's articles under the title 'Essays on Forest and Garden History'. Ref: NLI Ms 32,542

References

External links
 

1920 births
1988 deaths
20th-century Irish botanists
Academic staff of the University of the Witwatersrand
20th-century women scientists
Irish expatriates in South Africa
Irish women botanists